Tokerau Beach is a settlement on the northwestern side of Doubtless Bay  on the Karikari Peninsula of Northland, New Zealand.

Demographics
Statistics New Zealand describes Tokerau Beach as a rural settlement. Tokerau Beach is part of the larger Karikari Peninsula statistical area.

Tokerau Beach had a population of 237 at the 2018 New Zealand census, an increase of 39 people (19.7%) since the 2013 census, and an increase of 84 people (54.9%) since the 2006 census. There were 99 households, comprising 114 males and 123 females, giving a sex ratio of 0.93 males per female. The median age was 56.6 years (compared with 37.4 years nationally), with 39 people (16.5%) aged under 15 years, 18 (7.6%) aged 15 to 29, 99 (41.8%) aged 30 to 64, and 78 (32.9%) aged 65 or older.

Ethnicities were 83.5% European/Pākehā, 32.9% Māori, 5.1% Pacific peoples, 2.5% Asian, and 3.8% other ethnicities. People may identify with more than one ethnicity.

Of those people who chose to answer the census's question about religious affiliation, 44.3% had no religion, 48.1% were Christian, 1.3% had Māori religious beliefs and 1.3% had other religions.

Of those at least 15 years old, 21 (10.6%) people had a bachelor or higher degree, and 51 (25.8%) people had no formal qualifications. The median income was $22,100, compared with $31,800 nationally. 12 people (6.1%) earned over $70,000 compared to 17.2% nationally. The employment status of those at least 15 was that 69 (34.8%) people were employed full-time, 30 (15.2%) were part-time, and 9 (4.5%) were unemployed.

References

Far North District
Populated places in the Northland Region